Samat Amangeldyevich Sarsenov (born 19 August 1996) is a Kazakh football midfielder who plays for FC Okzhetpes in the Kazakhstan Premier League.

Career
Sarsenov made his debut in the Russian Second Division for FC Nosta Novotroitsk on 26 July 2013 in a game against FC Oktan Perm.

On 27 March 2017, Sarsenov joined Kazakhstan Premier League side FC Kairat on a three-year contract.

On 24 July 2019, Sarsenov joined FC Taraz on loan for the remainder of the 2019 Kazakhstan Premier League season.

On 6 February 2020, Kairat confirmed that Sarsenov had left the club to join Valmiera FC in the Latvian Higher League. He joined fellow league club FK Spartaks Jūrmala on 1 September 2020.

Career statistics

Club

References

External links
 Career summary by sportbox.ru  
 

1996 births
Russian people of Kazakhstani descent
Living people
Russian footballers
Kazakhstani footballers
Kazakhstani expatriate footballers
Kazakhstan under-21 international footballers
Association football midfielders
Kazakhstan Premier League players
Latvian Higher League players
FC Orenburg players
FC Kairat players
FC Taraz players
Valmieras FK players
FK Spartaks Jūrmala players
FC Okzhetpes players
Kazakhstani expatriate sportspeople in Latvia
Expatriate footballers in Latvia
FC Nosta Novotroitsk players